Transita is a genus of moths belonging to the subfamily Tortricinae of the family Tortricidae. It contains only one species, Transita exaesia, which is found in Nepal.

Adults are generally monochrome brownish, but some specimens have three darker costal spots on the forewings and others have traces of a paler ground colour.

See also
List of Tortricidae genera

References

External links
tortricidae.com

Tortricini
Monotypic moth genera
Moths of Asia
Tortricidae genera